Oxyclozanide is a salicylanilide anthelmintic. It is used in the treatment and control of fascioliasis in ruminants mainly domestic animals such as cattle, sheep, and goats. It mainly acts by uncoupling of oxidative phosphorylation in flukes. Along with niclosamide, another tapeworm drug, it has been recently found to display "strong in vivo and in vitro activity against methicillin-resistant Staphylococcus aureus (MRSA)".

Sometimes alluded to as "Pentaclosamide": CN101891646.

References

Anthelmintics
Chloroarenes
Phenols
Salicylanilides